Árni Vilhjálmsson (born 9 May 1994) is an Icelandic professional footballer who plays as a striker.

Club career
In January 2017, Árni joined Swedish side Jönköpings Södra IF. On 28 January 2022, he signed for French club Rodez.

Personal life 
Vilhjálmsson is in relationship with fellow footballer Sara Björk Gunnarsdóttir, with whom he has a son.

Career statistics

Club

Honours 
Breiðablik
 Úrvalsdeild: 2010

References

External links 
 

1994 births
Arni Vilhjalmsson
Living people
Arni Vilhjalmsson
Arni Vilhjalmsson
Arni Vilhjalmsson
Arni Vilhjalmsson
Arni Vilhjalmsson
Lillestrøm SK players
Jönköpings Södra IF players
Bruk-Bet Termalica Nieciecza players
FC Chornomorets Odesa players
FC Kolos Kovalivka players
Rodez AF players
Association football forwards
Arni Vilhjalmsson
Arni Vilhjalmsson
Eliteserien players
Allsvenskan players
Superettan players
I liga players
Ukrainian Premier League players
Ligue 2 players
Arni Vilhjalmsson
Expatriate footballers in Norway
Arni Vilhjalmsson
Expatriate footballers in Sweden
Arni Vilhjalmsson
Expatriate footballers in Poland
Arni Vilhjalmsson
Expatriate footballers in Ukraine
Arni Vilhjalmsson
Expatriate footballers in France
Arni Vilhjalmsson